The 1992 SEC men's basketball tournament took place from March 12–15, 1992 at the Birmingham-Jefferson Convention Complex in Birmingham, Alabama. The Kentucky Wildcats, who returned to the tournament after a two-year NCAA-sanctioned ban, won the tournament and received the SEC’s automatic bid to the 1992 NCAA Men’s Division I Basketball Tournament by defeating the Alabama Crimson Tide by a score of 80–54. That win would be Kentucky’s 17th overall SEC tournament title.  Auburn did not participate, leaving only 11 teams in the field.

Television coverage of the tournament was produced and regionally syndicated entirely by Jefferson Pilot Sports.

Bracket

References

SEC men's basketball tournament
1991–92 Southeastern Conference men's basketball season
1992 in sports in Alabama
Basketball competitions in Birmingham, Alabama
College basketball tournaments in Alabama